Acrolophus exaphrista is a moth of the family Acrolophidae. It was described by Edward Meyrick in 1919. It is found in North America.

References

Moths described in 1919
exaphrista